Roy Rudonja (born 26 February 1995) is a Slovenian football forward.

Personal life
He is a son of Mladen Rudonja, a Slovenian footballer who represented the national team at the UEFA Euro 2000 and 2002 FIFA World Cup.

References

External links

Roy Rudonja at NZS 

1995 births
Living people
Sportspeople from Koper
Slovenian footballers
Association football forwards
Slovenian expatriate footballers
Slovenia youth international footballers
Leicester City F.C. players
Sheffield Wednesday F.C. players
NK Domžale players
NK Ankaran players
NK Krško players
RKC Waalwijk players
NK Brežice 1919 players
NK Drava Ptuj (2004) players
Senglea Athletic F.C. players
Slovenian Second League players
Slovenian PrvaLiga players
Eerste Divisie players
Expatriate footballers in England
Expatriate footballers in the Netherlands
Expatriate footballers in Austria
Expatriate footballers in Malta
Slovenian expatriate sportspeople in England
Slovenian expatriate sportspeople in the Netherlands
Slovenian expatriate sportspeople in Austria